The Hirondel (sometimes misspelled as Hirondelle) is a fictional car driven by Simon Templar, the protagonist of a book series by Leslie Charteris. The Hirondel is an opulent, eight-cylinder, cream and red vehicle costing £5,000 and is a recurring element in many of The Saint books. The Hirondel is also used by Storm (Captain Arden) in the non-Saint novel Daredevil. Daredevil also features inspector Teal. The Hirondel was featured in a 1972 issue of Automobile Quarterly (Vol. 10 No. 1).

References

External links
 The Saint's Hirondel—Article at www.saint.org
 The Cars of The Saint—Article at www.saint.org
 Teal Cars—A Bugatti-inspired recreation of the Hirondel as it might have been 

Fictional cars